Richard T. Grucela (born April 26, 1946) is a Democratic former member of the Pennsylvania House of Representatives.

References

External links
Pennsylvania House of Representatives - Richard Grucela (Democrat) official PA House website
Pennsylvania House Democratic Caucus - Richard Grucela official Party website

Living people
1946 births
Democratic Party members of the Pennsylvania House of Representatives